The 1912–13 season was the 1st season of FIFA-sanctioned soccer in the United States.

Honors and achievements

National team

Men's 

No national team matches were played during the 1912–13 season.

League standings

References 

 
Seasons in American soccer